Lifestyle Network (known in the Philippines from 2015 to 2018 as simply Lifestyle), was a global Filipino pay TV channel based in Quezon City. It was owned and operated by Creative Programs, a subsidiary of the media conglomerate ABS-CBN. Its programming was composed primarily of lifestyle and entertainment shows targeted to upscale Filipino women in the Filipino diaspora.

On April 2, 2018, the domestic Lifestyle was relaunched as Metro Channel. The North American version of the network continued to be distributed in the United States and Canada until November 30, 2020. After which, programs that formerly aired on the international channel were transferred to ANC Global.

Programs

References

External links 
 

Television networks in the Philippines
Television channels and stations established in 1999
2018 disestablishments in the Philippines
English-language television stations in the Philippines
Women's interest channels
Creative Programs
Assets owned by ABS-CBN Corporation
1999 establishments in the Philippines
ABS-CBN Corporation channels
Defunct television networks in the Philippines
Television channels and stations disestablished in 2020